There have been several instances of religious violence against Muslims since the partition of India in 1947, frequently in the form of violent attacks on Muslims by Hindu nationalist mobs that form a pattern of sporadic sectarian violence between the Hindu and Muslim communities. Over 10,000 people have been killed in Hindu-Muslim communal violence since 1950 in 6,933 instances of communal violence between 1954 and 1982.

The causes of violence against Muslims are varied. The roots are thought to lie in Indian history – resentment towards the Islamic conquest of India during the Middle Ages, divisive policies established by the colonial government during the period of British rule, and the partition of Indian subcontinent into a Muslim-majority Pakistan and an Indian state with a Muslim minority. Many scholars believe that incidents of anti-Muslim violence are politically motivated and a part of the electoral strategy of mainstream political parties who are associated with Hindu nationalism like the Bharatiya Janata Party. Other scholars believe that the violence is not widespread but that it is restricted to certain urban areas because of local socio-political conditions.

Background 
The roots of anti-Muslim violence can be traced to events in Indian history – resentment towards the Islamic conquest of India during the Middle Ages, divisive policies established by the colonial government during the period of British rule (particularly after the suppression of the Indian Rebellion of 1857, which saw Hindus and Muslims cooperate in revolt against the East India Company), and the partition of India into Muslim-majority Pakistan and an Indian state with a Muslim minority.

A major factor in the rising tide of violence against Muslims is the proliferation of Hindu-nationalist parties, which work alongside or under the political umbrella of the Rashtriya Swayamsevak Sangh. This is evident in Golwalkar's writings about Hitler's Nazi-Germany where he observed: "Race pride at its highest has been manifested here. Germany has also shown how well nigh impossible it is for Races and cultures, having differences going to the root, to be assimilated into one united whole, a good lesson for use in Hindusthan to learn and profit by." Since former-BJP leader LK Advani took the Hindutva-ideology to the mainstream of Indian politics by way of a Ram Rath Yatra, violent attacks on Muslim minorities have increased. Scholars argue that anti-Muslim rhetoric, politics, and policies have proved beneficial for Hindutva-leaders, especially the BJP, and therefore can be said to be politically motivated.

Manifestation
Violence against Muslims is frequently in the form of mob attacks on Muslims by Hindus. These attacks are referred to as communal riots in India and are seen to be part of a pattern of sporadic sectarian violence between the majority Hindu and minority Muslim communities, and have also been connected to a rise in Islamophobia throughout the 20th century. Most incidents have occurred in the northern and western states of India, whereas communalist sentiment in the south is less pronounced. Among the largest incidents in post-partition India include the large-scale killing of Muslims following the Operation Polo in Hyderabad, anti-Muslim riots in Kolkata in the aftermath of 1950 Barisal Riots and 1964 East Pakistan riots, 1969 Gujarat riots, 1984 Bhiwandi riot, 1985 Gujarat riots, 1989 Bhagalpur violence, Bombay riots, Nellie in 1983 and Gujarat riot in 2002 and 2013 Muzaffarnagar riots.

These patterns of violence have been well-established since partition, with dozens of studies documenting instances of mass violence against minority groups. Over 10,000 people have been killed in Hindu-Muslim communal violence since 1950. According to official figures, there were 6,933 instances of communal violence between 1954 and 1982 and, between 1968 and 1980, there were 530 Hindus and 1,598 Muslims killed in a total of 3,949 instances of mass violence.

In 1989, there were incidents of mass violence throughout the north of India.  Praveen Swami believes these periodic acts of violence have "scarred India's post independence history" and have also hindered India's cause in Jammu and Kashmir with regard to the Kashmir conflict.

In 2017, IndiaSpend reported that 84% of the victims of cow vigilante violence in India from 2010 to 2017 were Muslims, and almost 97% of these attacks were reported after May 2014.

Causes and effects

Some scholars have described incidents of anti-Muslim violence as politically motivated and organized and called them pogroms, or a form of state terrorism with "organized political massacres" rather than mere "riots". Others argue that, although their community faces discrimination and violence, some Muslims have been highly successful, that the violence is not as widespread as it appears, but is restricted to certain urban areas because of local socio-political conditions, and there are many cities where Muslims and Hindus live peacefully together with almost no incidences of sectarian violence.

Role of political parties
Many social scientists feel that many of the stated acts of violence are institutionally supported, particularly by political parties and organizations connected to the Hindu nationalist volunteer organisation, Rashtriya Swayamsevak Sangh (RSS). In particular, scholars fault the Bharatiya Janata Party (BJP) and the Shiv Sena for complicity in these incidents of violence and of using violence against Muslims as a part of a larger electoral strategy. For example, research by Raheel Dhattiwala and Michael Biggs has stated that killings are far higher in areas where the BJP faces stiff electoral opposition than in areas in which it is already strong. In 1989, the north of India saw an increase in orchestrated attacks on Muslims, and the BJP had further success in the local and state elections. The social anthropologist Stanley Jeyaraja Tambiah concludes that the violence in Bhagalpur in 1989, Hashimpura in 1987 and Moradabad in 1980 were organised killings. According to Ram Puniyani, the Shiv Sena were victorious in the elections due to the violence in the 1990s, and the BJP in Gujarat after the 2002 violence. Gyan Prakash, however, cautions that the BJP's actions in Gujarat do not equate to the entirety of India, and it remains to be seen if the Hindutva movement has been successful in the deployment of this strategy nationwide.

Economic and cultural factors
Hindu nationalists use the historical subjugation of India by Muslims as an excuse for violence. They feel that, since the Partition, Indian Muslims are allied to Pakistan and are possibly radicalised and, therefore, the Hindus must take defensive steps to avoid repeat of the past wrongs and reassert their pride. The higher fertility rate among Muslims has been a recurring theme in the Hindu Right's rhetoric. They claim that the higher birth rate among Muslims is part of a plan to turn the Hindus into a minority within their own country.

Another reason given for these outbreaks of violence is the upward mobility of the lower castes caused by the expansion of the economy. The violence has become a substitute for class tensions.  Nationalists, rather than deal with the claims from the lower class, instead view Muslims and Christians as not "fully Indian" due to their religion, and portray those who carry out these attacks as "heroes" that defended the majority from "anti-nationals". Muslims are viewed as suspect and their loyalty to the state is questioned because of the ill-will still prevalent after the violence during partition. According to Omar Khalidi:

Anti-Muslim violence is planned and executed to render Muslims economically and socially crippled and, as a final outcome of that economic and social backwardness, assimilating them into lower rungs of Hindu society.

Cultural nationalism has also been given as a reason for instances of violence carried out by Shiv Sena which initially claimed to speak for the people of Maharashtra, but quickly turned their rhetoric to inciting violence against Muslims. The Shiv Sena were complicit in the violence in 1984 in the town of Bhiwandi, and again in the violence in Bombay in 1992 and 1993. Violence has been incited by Sena in 1971 and 1986.  According to Sudipta Kaviraj, the Vishva Hindu Parishad (VHP) are still engaged in the religious conflicts which began in the medieval times.

Anti-Muslim violence creates a security risk for Hindus residing outside of India. Since the 1950s, there have been retaliatory attacks on Hindus in Pakistan and Bangladesh in response to anti-Muslim violence in India. After the 1992 violence in Bombay, Hindu temples were attacked in Britain, Dubai and Thailand. This recurring violence has become a rigidly conventional pattern which has created a divide between the Muslim and Hindu communities.

Jamaat-e-Islami Hind has spoken out against these communal clashes, as it believes that the violence not only impacts upon Muslims, but India as a whole, and that these riots are damaging to India's progress. In Gujarat, the Terrorist and Disruptive Activities (Prevention) Act (TADA) was used in incidents pertaining to communal violence in 1992 and 1993.  The majority of those arrested under the act were Muslim.  Conversely, TADA was not used after the violence carried out against Muslims during the Bombay riots.

Demographics
The BJP politicians, as well as those of other parties, argue that demographics play an essential role in Indian elections. The BJP believe that the higher the number of Muslims within a constituency, the higher are the chances of centrist parties to acquiesce to minority groups' requests, which lowers the chances of Muslims "building bridges" with their Hindu neighbours.  As such, according to this argument "Muslim appeasement" is the root cause of communal violence. Susanne and Lloyd Rudolph argue that the economic disparity is a reason for the aggression shown towards Muslims by Hindus. As India's economy expanded due to globalization and investment from overseas companies, the expectations of the Hindu population were not matched by the opportunities. Hindu nationalists then encouraged the perception of Muslims as the source of the Hindus' troubles.

The actions of anti-Hindu and anti-India militant groups in Kashmir and Pakistan have reinforced anti-Muslim feelings in India, which has strengthened the Hindu Right. The Hindutva discourse portrays Muslims as traitors and state enemies, whose patriotism is suspected. Sumit Ganguly argues that the rise in terrorism cannot only be attributed to socioeconomic factors, but also to the violence perpetrated by Hindutva forces.

Major incidents

Approximate total victims due to major incidents

1964 Kolkata riots
Riots between Hindus and Muslims had left over a hundred people dead, 438 people were injured. Over 7000 people were arrested. 70,000 Muslims have fled their homes and 55,000 were provided protection by the Indian army. Muslims in Kolkata became more ghettoized than ever before in the aftermath of this riot. Violence was also seen in rural West Bengal.

1983 Nellie massacre

On 18 February 1983 between 1,600 to 2,000 Muslims of East Bengal origin from various villages under the Nellie police station in Assam's Nagaon district (now Morigaon) were killed by their tribal and low-caste Hindu village neighbors. The incident began in the early morning when groups of villagers burned down the homes of the victims; and with no place to hide and outnumbered the victims ran towards the direction of a CRPF camp with the perpetrators pursuing and hacking to death those who fell back.  As a result, those dead were mostly women (70%), followed by the elderly (20%) and men (10%).      

This massacre happened in the context of the Assam Movement (1979–1985) that demanded the deletion of foreigners' names from the electoral roll. The Congress-led Government of India decided to go ahead with the 1983 Assembly elections without revising the electoral roll, which the movement leaders decided to boycott with widespread support from the local people. The Miya people decided to support the Congress party instead in the hope that it will end the movement. The AASU's call for boycott triggered widespread violence, with different ethnic, religious and linguistic groups clashing against each others in the then Nagaon district.  The Muslim people of Nellie, anticipating an attack, had reported the possibility of one to the police several times before the incident; and though police officers visited Muslim villages to assure their safety, no police personnel was deputed for their protection.

In the aftermath, both the Government of India and the movement leaders blamed each other for the responsibility for the massacre.  The government instituted the Tewary Commission, led by a retired IAS officer, in July 1983 to investigate the incident, and though the report has been printed, it has not been released to the public.  The Movement leaders boycotted the Tewary Commission, and supported a non-official judicial inquiry commission instead, led by T U Mehta, a retired chief justice of a high court.  Both the commissions are seen as biased and aligned to either the government or the movement leaders' perspective, and there exists no third-party report.  After the incident, hundreds of cases were filed, and hundreds of charge sheets were submitted by the police; but after the movement leaders came to power in Assam two years later in 1985 all cases concerning the 1983 election were closed and no one has been punished for the incident.  After the incident, both the survivors and the perpetrators went back to their villages, though not in complete harmony.

1969 riots to 1985 riots

During the 1969 Gujarat riots, it is estimated that 630 people lost their lives. The 1970 Bhiwandi Riots was an instance of anti-Muslim violence which occurred between 7 and 8 May in the Indian towns of Bhiwandi, Jalgaon and Mahad. There were large amounts of arson and vandalism of Muslim-owned properties. In 1980 in Moradabad, an estimated 2,500 people were killed. The official estimate is 400 and other observers estimate between 1,500 and 2,000. Local police were directly implicated in planning the violence.

1987 Hashimpura massacre

Hashimpura massacre happened on 22 May 1987, during the Hindu-Muslim riots in Meerut city in Uttar Pradesh state, India, when 19 personnel of the Provincial Armed Constabulary (PAC) allegedly rounded up 42 Muslim youth from the Hashimpura mohalla (locality) of the city, took them in truck to the outskirts, near Murad Nagar, in Ghaziabad district, where they were shot and their bodies were dumped in water canals. A few days later dead bodies were found floating in the canals. In May 2000, 16 of the 19 accused surrendered, and were later released on bail, while 3 were already dead. The trial of the case was transferred by the Supreme Court of India in 2002 from Ghaziabad to a Sessions Court at the Tis Hazari complex in Delhi, where it was the oldest pending case. On 21 March 2015, all 16 men accused in the Hashimpura massacre case of 1987 were acquitted by Tis Hazari Court due to insufficient evidence. The Court emphasized that the survivors could not recognize any of the accused PAC personnel. On 31 October 2018, the Delhi High Court convicted the 16 personnel of the PAC and sentenced them to life imprisonment, overturning the trial courts verdict.

1989 Bhagalpur violence 

In 1989 in Bhagalpur, it is estimated nearly 1,000 people lost their lives in violent attacks, believed to be a result of tensions raised over the Ayodhya dispute and the processions carried out by VHP activists, which were to be a show of strength and to serve as a warning to the minority communities. On 24 October 1989 in the Bhagalpur district of Bihar, the violent incidents happened for over 2 months. The violence affected the Bhagalpur city and 250 villages around it. Over 1,000 people were killed, and another 50,000 were displaced as a result of the violence. It was the worst Hindu-Muslim violence in independent India at the time.

1992 Bombay riots

The destruction of the Babri Mosque by Hindu nationalists led directly to the 1992 Bombay riots.According to an article published in The Hindu's Frontline magazine, titled Gory Winter, "officially, 900 people were killed in mob rioting and firing by the police, 2,036 injured and thousands internally displaced." BBC correspondent Toral Varia called the riots "a pre-planned pogrom," that had been in the making since 1990, and stated that the destruction of the mosque was "the final provocation".

Several scholars have likewise concluded that the riots must have been pre-planned, and that Hindu rioters had been given access to information about the locations of Muslim homes and businesses from non-public sources. This violence is widely reported as having been orchestrated by Shiv Sena, a Hindu nationalist group led by Bal Thackeray. A high-ranking member of the special branch, V. Deshmukh, gave evidence to the commission tasked with probing the riots. He said the failures in intelligence and prevention had been due to political assurances that the mosque in Ayodhya would be protected, that the police were fully aware of the Shiv Sena's capabilities to commit acts of violence, and that they had incited hate against the minority communities.

2002 Gujarat riots

Since partition, Muslim community has been subject to and engaged in violence in Gujarat. In 2002, in an incident described as an act of "fascistic state terror," Hindu extremists carried out acts of violence against the Muslim minority population.

The starting point for the incident was the Godhra train burning which was allegedly done by Muslims. During the incident, young girls were sexually assaulted, burned or hacked to death. These instances of violence condoned by the ruling BJP, whose refusal to intervene lead to the displacement of 200,000. Death toll figures range from the official estimate of 254 Hindus and 790 to 2,000 Muslims killed. Then Chief Minister Narendra Modi has also been accused of initiating and condoning the violence, as have the police and government officials who took part, as they directed the rioters and gave lists of Muslim-owned properties to the extremists.

Mallika Sarabhai, who had complained over state complicity in the violence, was harassed, intimidated and falsely accused of human trafficking by the BJP. Three police officers were given punitive transfers by the BJP after they had successfully put down the rioting in their wards, so as not to interfere further in preventing the violence. According to Brass, the only conclusion from the evidence which is available points to a methodical pogrom, which was carried out with "exceptional brutality and was highly coordinated".

In 2007, Tehelka magazine released "The Truth: Gujarat 2002," a report which implicated the state government in the violence, and claimed that what had been called a spontaneous act of revenge was, in reality, a "state-sanctioned pogrom". According to Human Rights Watch, the violence in Gujarat in 2002 was pre-planned, and the police and state government participated in the violence. In 2012, Modi was cleared of complicity in the violence by a Special Investigation Team appointed by the Supreme Court. The Muslim community is reported to have reacted with "anger and disbelief," and activist Teesta Setalvad has said the legal fight was not yet over, as they had the right to appeal. Human Rights Watch has reported on acts of exceptional heroism by Hindus, Dalits and tribals, who tried to protect Muslims from the violence.

2013 Muzaffarnagar riots

In year 2013 between August to September, conflicts between the two major religious communities Hindu and Muslims happened in Muzaffarnagar district of Uttar Pradesh state. These riots resulted in at least 62 deaths including 42 Muslims and 20 Hindus and injured 200 and left more than 50,000 displaced.

2020 Delhi riots

The 2020 Delhi riots, which left more than 53 dead and hundreds injured including both Hindus and Muslims, were triggered by protests against a citizenship law seen by many critics as anti-Muslim and part of Prime Minister Narendra Modi's Hindu nationalist agenda.

According to Thomas Blom Hansen, a Stanford University professor, across India "a lot of the violence perpetrated against Muslims these days is actually perpetrated by subsidiaries of the Hindu nationalist movement". According to Hansen, the police harassment of Muslims in Muslim neighborhoods in the run-up to the Delhi riots is "very well-documented". According to Sumantra Bose, a London School of Economics professor, since Narendra Modi's reelection in May 2019, his government has "moved on to larger-scale, if still localized, state-sanctioned mob violence". 

According to Ashutosh Varshney, the director of the Center for Contemporary South Asia at Brown University, "on the whole, the Delhi riots ... are now beginning to look like a pogrom, à la Gujarat 2002 and Delhi 1984". According to Subir Sinha, a senior lecturer at the SOAS University of London, the north and northeast areas of Delhi were a focus of "highly inflammatory speeches from top BJP ministers and politicians" in the run-up to the Delhi election. Sinha continues that "the pent-up anger of BJP supporters" who lost the election in Delhi, effectively took it out on "the Muslim residents of these relatively poor parts of the city".

Depictions
The film Parzania, which is based on the Gulbarg Society massacre which occurred during the 2002 violence, was boycotted by cinemas in Gujarat over fear of sparking another riot. The film documents atrocities such as families being burned alive in their homes by Hindu extremists, women being set on fire after being gang-raped, and children being hacked to pieces.

Final Solution by Rakesh Sharma is considered one of the better documentaries which covers the violence in Gujarat in 2002. The Central Board of Film Certification had tried to ban the film but, in 2004, chairman Anupam Kher granted a certificate which allowed an uncut version to be screened.

See also
 Saffron terror
 Cow vigilante violence in India
 Religious violence in India
 Violence against Christians in India
 Persecution of Muslims
 Terrorism in India
 2020 Delhi riots
 Hindutva
 Hate crime
 Hindu–Islamic relations
 Islam in India

References

Bibliography

External links

 

India
Persecution of Muslims
Religious riots
Riots and civil disorder in India
 
Islamophobia in India